Dale Thomas Anderson (10 June 1931 – 29 September 2021) was an Australian sportsman who played Australian rules football and first-class cricket.

Anderson played seven games for Victorian Football League club Melbourne during 1953 and 1954, kicking 15 goals. From 1952 to 1964 he appeared in a total of six first-class matches for Tasmania and took 14 wickets with his right-arm fast-medium pace bowling.

After leaving Melbourne during 1954, Anderson crossed to VFA team Williamstown and was full-forward in the premiership team of that year. He played 28 games and kicked 50 goals up until early in the 1956 season when he transferred to Sorrento FC. He kicked 22.15 in a game for Cooee against East Devonport in 1952 before coming to Melbourne.

See also
 List of Tasmanian representative cricketers

References

External links

Cricinfo profile
DemonWiki profile

1931 births
2021 deaths
Australian rules footballers from Tasmania
Melbourne Football Club players
Cooee Football Club players
Australian cricketers
Tasmania cricketers
People from Latrobe, Tasmania
Cricketers from Tasmania